, also titled Four Chimneys, is a 1953 Japanese comedy-drama film directed by Heinosuke Gosho. It was entered into the 3rd Berlin International Film Festival. Based on a novel by Rinzō Shiina, Where Chimneys Are Seen is regarded as one of Gosho's most important films and a typical example of the shomin-geki genre.

Plot
Hiroko Ogata and her second husband Ryukichi (her first husband Tsukahara is believed to have died in a bombing in the Second World War) live in the lower-class outskirts of Tokyo. The upper floor of the Ogatas' flat is rented to Kenzo and Senko, a young man and a woman who show interest in each other, but are still not a couple. One day, the Ogatas find a baby in the house entrance with a note signed by Tsukahara, stating it was Hiroko's daughter. The marriage is engulfed in a crisis, with Hiroko nearly committing suicide. Kenzo searches the city for Tsukahara and finally finds him and his new wife, the actual mother of the abandoned child, who initially had wanted to abort it. Although the Ogatas have developed an affection for the baby, which fell seriously ill at one point, they agree to return it to Mrs. Tsukahara who, after some hesitation, accepts it as her own.

Cast
 Ken Uehara as Ryukichi Ogata
 Kinuyo Tanaka as Hiroko Ogata
 Hiroshi Akutagawa as Kenzo Kubo
 Hideko Takamine as Senko Azuma
 Chieko Seki as Yukiko Ikeda
 Haruo Tanaka as Chuji Tsukahara
 Ranko Hanai as Katsuko Ishibashi
 Kumeko Urabe as Kayo Nojima
 Takeshi Sakamoto as Tokuji Kawamura
 Eiko Miyoshi as Ranko
 Hikaru Hoshi
 Tadayoshi Nakamura
 Shigeru Ogura
 Eiko Ohara
 Noriko Honma as Ayako Honma

Production and release
Where Chimneys Are Seen is based on the novel Mujaki na hitobito by Japanese writer Rinzō Shiina. It was produced by Gosho's own production company Studio Eight (1950–1954) and distributed by Shintoho studios.

References

External links

1953 films
1953 comedy-drama films
1950s Japanese-language films
Japanese black-and-white films
Films based on Japanese novels
Films shot in Tokyo
Films with screenplays by Hideo Oguni
Films scored by Yasushi Akutagawa
Films directed by Heinosuke Gosho
Japanese comedy-drama films
1950s Japanese films